Lake Waccamaw Depot is a historic train station located at Lake Waccamaw, Columbus County, North Carolina  It was built about 1900 by the Atlantic Coast Line Railroad, and is a one-story, Stick Style frame building with board-and-batten siding. It features shaped eave brackets, gable braces, and a long low slate covered gabled roof. The building was moved to its present location in 1974.  Also on the property is the contributing a rectangular board-and-batten covered Section House.

It was listed on the National Register of Historic Places in 1983.

The depot is now operated as the Lake Waccamaw Depot Museum, with displays of local history and natural history.

References

External links
 Lake Waccamaw Depot Museum - official site
 Picture in Nov of 1969 while still in use

Former Atlantic Coast Line Railroad stations
Railway stations on the National Register of Historic Places in North Carolina
Railway stations in the United States opened in 1900
National Register of Historic Places in Columbus County, North Carolina
Museums in Columbus County, North Carolina
Former railway stations in North Carolina